Hassan Ahmed Bouhadi (حسن بوهادي) (born 1973) is the Chairman of the Board of Directors of the Libyan Investment Authority (LIA), Libya's sovereign wealth fund, a position he has occupied since October 2014, after serving as a member of LIA’s Board of Directors and as Secretary of the Board of Trustees. He was appointed by the internationally recognised government of Tobruk and set up office in Malta.

A Libyan national, educated at University College London and Imperial College of Science and Technology, Bouhadi played a role in the Libyan Revolution charged with coordinating humanitarian activities with the international community as a member of the Libyan Stabilization Team under the National Transitional Council. Prior to the Revolution Bouhadi held several regional management positions in the UK, Middle East and Africa for multinational companies, including Bechtel International, Fosroc (a BP company), BASF and GE.

References

1973 births
Living people